Jules Noël is the name of

 Jules Noël (athlete) (1903–1940), French discus thrower and shot putter
 Jules Achille Noël (1815–1881), French landscape and maritime painter